Ashton Rome (born December 31, 1985) is a Canadian former professional ice hockey winger, who most notably played with the Worcester Sharks in the American Hockey League (AHL).

Playing career
Rome played his junior hockey in the Western Hockey League with the Moose Jaw Warriors, Red Deer Rebels and Kamloops Blazers. He was selected twice in the National Hockey League Entry Draft, initially by the Boston Bruins in 2004, and then by the San Jose Sharks in 2006. Rome captured the Calder Cup as the American Hockey League champions with the Hershey Bears for the 2009–10 season.

After his first two seasons in the German DEL with Düsseldorfer EG, Rome signed a one-year contract with fellow DEL club, Schwenninger Wild Wings on March 1, 2014. After spending a second year with the Schwenningen outfit, he signed with the Iserlohn Roosters of the DEL in April 2016. Rome parted company with the Roosters in the course of the 2016–17 season and signed in the ECHL with the Manchester Monarchs in December 2016. He played out the season with the Monarchs, collecting 12 goals and 18 points in 36 games.

On July 13, 2017, Rome returned to Worcester as a free agent, signing a one-year deal with inaugural club, the Worcester Railers, to continue in the ECHL. On March 5, 2018, Rome was traded back to the Manchester Monarchs for defenseman Justin Agosta.

Rome retired from professional hockey after 12-year professional career at the conclusion of the 2017–18 season.

Career statistics

References

External links

1985 births
Boston Bruins draft picks
Düsseldorfer EG players
Greenville Road Warriors players
Hershey Bears players
Idaho Steelheads (ECHL) players
Iserlohn Roosters players
Kamloops Blazers players
Living people
Ice hockey people from Manitoba
Manchester Monarchs (ECHL) players
Moose Jaw Warriors players
Phoenix RoadRunners players
Portland Pirates players
Red Deer Rebels players
San Jose Sharks draft picks
Schwenninger Wild Wings players
Toronto Marlies players
Worcester Railers players
Worcester Sharks players
Canadian ice hockey right wingers